Chaman is a city in Pakistan.

Chaman may also refer to:

Villages in Iran
Chaman-e Bahram
Chaman-e Buraki
Chaman-e Morvarid
Chaman Zar (disambiguation)
Chaman, Gilan
Chaman, Golestan
Chaman, Ilam
Chaman, Kerman
Chaman, Kermanshah
Chaman, Khuzestan
Chaman, Haftgel
Chaman, Mazandaran
Chaman, West Azerbaijan
Chaman, Sumay-ye Beradust

Other places
Chaman border crossing on the Pakistan-Afghanistan border
Chaman District in Pakistan
Chaman Fault, a geological fault in Pakistan and Afghanistan
Chaman Mahal, a palace in the Bhopal district of Madhya Pradesh, India
Chaman Rural District in West Azerbaijan Province, Iran

Other uses
Chaman (name)
Ujda Chaman, a 2019 Indian Hindi-language film
Chaman Bahaar, a 2020 Indian Hindi-language film